Gilles Bouvard (born 30 October 1969) is a French former racing cyclist. He competed in four editions of the Tour de France and one Vuelta a España.

Major results

1993
 1st Paris–Mantes
1994
 7th Overall Tour de l'Avenir
1995
 9th Paris–Camembert
1996
 1st Stage 3 Critérium du Dauphiné Libéré
 6th Overall Route du Sud
 10th Overall Grand Prix du Midi Libre
1997
 1st Stage 2b Tour Méditerranéen (TTT)
 2nd Grand Prix d'Ouverture La Marseillaise
 2nd Overall Tour du Limousin
1st Stage 1
1998
 2nd Grand Prix de Rennes
 4th Route Adélie
 5th Grand Prix d'Ouverture La Marseillaise
 7th Overall Grand Prix du Midi Libre
1999
 5th Overall Route du Sud
 9th Tour du Haut Var
 10th Overall Critérium du Dauphiné Libéré
2000
 9th A Travers le Morbihan
2001
 3rd Overall Regio-Tour
 6th Overall Tour du Limousin
1st Stage 4
 7th Boucles de l'Aulne
2003
 2nd GP Citta 'di Rio Saliceto e Correggio
 4th Polynormande
 6th Tour du Doubs
 9th Boucles de l'Aulne
2004
 5th Tour du Finistère

Grand Tour general classification results timeline

References

External links

Sportspeople from Bourg-en-Bresse
1969 births
Living people
French male cyclists
Cyclists from Auvergne-Rhône-Alpes